Chulanak-e Sofla (also Romanized as Chūlānak-e Soflá; also known as Jelūnak-e Pā’īn, Chūlānak-e Pā’īn, and Chūlūnak-e Pā’īn) is a village in Roqicheh Rural District, Kadkan District, Torbat-e Heydarieh County, Razavi Khorasan Province, Iran. At the 2006 census, its population was 153, in 38 families.

References 

Populated places in Torbat-e Heydarieh County